Grown Love is the second studio album released by the Taiwanese singer-songwriter, Eve Ai. It was released on 16 October 2014.

Track listing

Music videos

Awards and nominations

References 

2014 albums
Eve Ai albums